Abu ʿAmr Shuʿayb ibn ʿUmar ibn ʿIsā al-Balluti, also Saet or Saïpes (Σαΐπης) in the Byzantine sources, was the second Emir of Crete, ruling c. 855 – c. 880.

The surviving records on the internal history and rulers of the Emirate of Crete are very fragmentary. Shu'ayb was the son of the conqueror of Crete and founder of the Emirate of Crete, Abu Hafs Umar. Following the studies of George C. Miles with the aid of numismatic evidence, his reign is tentatively placed from c. 855 to c. 880, although a gold dinar struck in his name is dated as late as 894/5. Shu'ayb is also commonly identified with the "Saet" or "Saïpes" of the Byzantine chroniclers, Theophanes Continuatus, John Skylitzes, and Genesios.

The Byzantine chroniclers report that in c. 872/3, he sent the renegade Photios to raid the Byzantine Empire, leading to the two heavy defeats of the Cretans at Kardia and the Gulf of Corinth at the hands of the Byzantine admiral Niketas Ooryphas. These Byzantine victories apparently led to a temporary truce, and it appears that Shu'ayb was obliged to pay tribute to Byzantium for about a decade. Two of Shu'ayb's sons, Umar and Muhammad, succeeded him.

References

Sources
 
 
 
 

9th-century Arabs
9th-century rulers in Europe
Emirs of Crete